The 2000 North Dakota gubernatorial election took place on November 7, 2000 for the post of Governor of North Dakota. Incumbent Republican Governor Ed Schafer decided not to run for reelection. Republican nominee John Hoeven won the election over Democratic State Attorney General Heidi Heitkamp. Heitkamp had led in the polls until early October, when reports indicated that she had breast cancer, and would undergo surgery. She ran advertisements to assure voters she was still fit to serve; however, by the final month, Hoeven had taken a six-point lead in polling. As of 2021, this is the most recent North Dakota gubernatorial election in which the Democratic nominee received over 40% of the vote. And she had the best performance for Any Democratic candidate For governor since 1988 and no candidate since her has managed to get over 40% of the vote. And  she has the best performance for anyone who has ran against John Hoeven For statewide office .
From 2013 to 2019, both Hoeven and Heitkamp served alongside each other in the United States Senate.

Candidates

Democratic
Heidi Heitkamp, Attorney General of North Dakota

Republican
John Hoeven, President of the Bank of North Dakota

Campaign

Debates
Complete video of debate, September 13, 2000
Complete video of debate, October 18, 2000

Results

References

North Dakota
Gubernatorial
2000